Manuel María de la Concepción Gautier (December 8, 1830 – May 24, 1897) was a politician from the Dominican Republic. He served as the acting president of the Dominican Republic from February 27 to April 30, 1889 and later as Vice President of the Dominican Republic from 1889 to 1893.

He was Minister of Finance of the Dominican Republic in 1876.

References

|-

1830 births
1897 deaths
19th-century Dominican Republic politicians
Presidents of the Dominican Republic
Vice presidents of the Dominican Republic
Finance ministers of the Dominican Republic
White Dominicans